Reigne is the 11th studio album by Filipino singer-actress Regine Velasquez, released on November 29, 2001, by Viva Records in the Philippines in CD and cassette format and later in digital download. The album was produced by Velasquez and contained original Filipino compositions by Janno Gibbs, Trina Belamide and Tats Faustino among others. The carrier single released is "To Reach You" composed by Lisa Dy and Chat Zamora. The album was certified triple platinum by the Philippine Association of the Record Industry (PARI).

Background
Reigne is her third studio album from Viva Records Corporation after doing two soundtrack albums under the label. The album title is an anagram of Velasquez's name, Regine and later used as one of her signature perfume for Bench. The album also released a limited specially packaged long box edition that includes limited edition 14-carat gold Reigne necklace, exclusive song lyric booklet and full size photos taken by Jun de Leon which is not available on the regular edition.

Singles
The lead single to be taken off the album is "To Reach You". The music video for the single was directed by Louie Ignacio and was nominated at the 2002 MTV Pilipinas Video Awards for Best Song, Best Female Video and Best Director.
The second single is "Dadalhin" composed by Tats Faustino released in May 2002. The song garnered biggest airplay in local radio stations in Philippine history and remained number 1 until after four months. The song also became 2002's song of the year in the Philippines, and eventually went on to become one of Velasquez's signature original songs.
The last single released was "Sa Aking Pag-iisa" in October 2002 and composed by fellow singer Janno Gibbs. The remix version of the song was arranged by Raul Mitra and was later included in Velasquez' "Greatest Hits" album. The music video for the single was directed by Louie Ignacio.

Reigne: The Book
Three years after the album has been released, Velasquez together with Filipino photographer Jun de Leon collaborated to create a coffee table book which was named after the successful album. It features 200 pages of Velasquez's photographs chronicled by de Leon after working with the latter for five years. The coffee book comes in a special gift box that includes an EP CD with songs The First Time I Ever Saw Your Face and Misty Glass Window. It was released by Viva Foundation For The Arts.

Track listing
Reigne (standard version)

Reigne: The Book (EP)

Album Credits
Personnel
Vic del Rosario, Jr. – executive producer
Vincent G. del Rosario III – executive producer
Regine Velasquez – producer
Jun de Leon – photography
Production
Regine Velasquez – vocals, background vocals
Cacai Velasquez-Mitra – background vocals
Trina Belamide – background vocals
Marc Lopez – arranger
Niño Regalado – arranger
Rudy Lozano – arranger
Tats Faustino – arranger
Noel Mendez – arranger
Raul Mitra – arranger
Mon Faustino – arranger, vocal arranger, guitars
Ding Faustino – guitars
Ric Mercado – arranger, guitars
Marvin Querido – arranger

References

See also
 Regine Velasquez discography
 List of best-selling albums in the Philippines

Regine Velasquez albums
2001 albums